Hrvoje Kečkeš (born 17 March 1975) is a Croatian actor. He appeared in more than thirty films since 1999.

Selected filmography

References

External links 

1975 births
Living people
Male actors from Zagreb
Croatian male film actors